Nicholas Monroe Smith Jr. (1914 – 2003) was a nuclear physicist and research consultant. Smith was an expert on reactor physics, a developer of operations research/computer modeling, and a computer applications consultant. He had ties to the Manhattan Project at Chicago and Oak Ridge, and worked with Samuel Allison and James Van Allen. Smith was a pioneer in the field of operations research.

Early life and education
Smith was born on March 23, 1914, in Little Rock, Arkansas, the son of Nick Monroe Smith and Mary Gossett.
He attended the University of Arkansas and received his Bachelor of Arts degree in mathematics and physics.
According to the US Census, in 1940 Smith and his wife Elizabeth resided in Chicago, Illinois.
At the University of Chicago, he earned a master's and doctoral degrees in physics. He worked in the Ryerson Physical Laboratory,
At University of Chicago, his advisor was Samuel Allison and graduate studies involved work on Chicago Pile-1, the first controlled nuclear chain reaction by Enrico Fermi.
Smith landed a postdoctoral fellowship at the Carnegie Institution of Washington, Washington, D.C., and performed research with James Van Allen in the Department of Terrestrial Magnetism. In addition to Allison, Smith worked with physicist Lester Skaggs to design an aircraft proximity detection system that utilized radio waves to locate and detonate anti-aircraft shells.

Career as a physicist
Following the outbreak of World War II, Smith obtained a position at the Johns Hopkins University Applied Physics Laboratory in Maryland. As a civilian scientist, he was assigned to the Army Air Force in England, and 
planned railway targets for airstrikes in support of D-Day. For this work he was presented with the Medal of Freedom.

After World War II, Smith worked as a physicist at Oak Ridge National Laboratory in Tennessee from 1946 to 1951. He studied and reported on the dangers of radioactive material contamination from nuclear weapons.

In 1949, Smith at Oak Ridge conducted a study sponsored by the Atomic Energy Commission (A.E.C.)'s Division of Biology and Medicine, and performed calculations to determine the theoretical number of atomic bomb detonations necessary to achieve significant radiation exposure and radioactive material fallout. In 1951 after the Ranger and Greenhouse tests, Smith reassessed the earlier calculations and estimates. He determined that detonation of 100,000 Nagasaki type bombs would be sufficient to achieve the doomsday effect. With this information, the A.E.C.'s staff of the Division of Biology and Medicine concluded this to be extremely remote and dubbed the study as Project GABRIEL.

Project GABRIEL
In the AEC, the group responsible for Project GABRIEL was the Division of Biology and Medicine. The Division was charged with maintenance of experimental studies and field studies. The Division was required to collect and analyze data from internal and external sources. In 1949, Smith performed a theoretical analysis of the long term aspects of Project GABRIEL. He reached the conclusion that:

In 1952, the RAND Corporation completed a study of Project GABRIEL, and was charged with analyzing the short term characteristics of nuclear fallout. The study was dubbed Project AUREOLE.

Operations research
For 20 years, Smith worked at Research Analysis Corporation as leader in the Advanced Research Department, a U.S. Army funded successor to the Operations Research Office.  The focus of the work was war games simulation and nonlinear computer programming. His department produced numerous professional papers, including two Lanchester prize-winning books.

In 1971, Smith founded TELIMIS Corporation, based in Springfield, Virginia, a company that developed applications in computer technology. He went on to work as a consultant and served as chief scientist at the Washington Institute of Technology in Fairfax City, Virginia. Smith died on August 7, 2003, at his home in Lusby, Maryland of metastatic prostate cancer.

Awards and honors
Phi Beta Kappa
Sigma Xi
Medal of Freedom, for World War II work in operations research

Professional affiliations
American Society for Cybernetics
Society for General Systems Research
Operations Research Society of America

Patents
Apparatus for observing the conduct of a projectile in a gun.
Microwave measuring of projectile speed.

Death
Smith died August 7, 2003.

References

1914 births
2003 deaths
People from Little Rock, Arkansas
University of Arkansas alumni
University of Chicago alumni
Manhattan Project people
Johns Hopkins University people
United States Army Air Forces personnel of World War II
Oak Ridge National Laboratory people
American mathematicians
American computer scientists
American operations researchers
20th-century American physicists
Deaths from prostate cancer
Deaths from cancer in Maryland
United States Army Air Forces officers
United States Army civilians